The flag and coat of arms of Kedah are the state symbols of Kedah, Malaysia. Very little distinction is present between the flag and coat of arms of the state, as the flag consists of only a red field with the state arms on the upper hoist.

Flag 

The Kedahan flag is essentially a red flag with only the state arms of Kedah charged on its upper hoist, the upper left quarter of the flag. The red, Kedah's traditional colour, signifies prosperity, while the flag's arms is as interpreted with the standalone arms.

History 
During the beginning of the 18th century, Kedah's flag only consists of a plain red field. In 1821, the flag was changed to be charged with a yellow tiger. This flag came to be known as the "harimau terkam" (pouncing tiger) or "harimau melompat" (jumping tiger) flag. The flag was used during Sultan Ahmad Tajuddin Halim Shah II's reign, and was raised on top of the Kota Kedah before the Siam capture of the fort and occupation of the sultanate during which they took down the flag. The flag went on being used by the Sultan's troops while recapturing the land and remained as the state flag until 1912 when it was changed to instead be charged with the state arms on the upper hoist.

Variants

Standards 

Kedah's royalty flies a series of Royal Standards that consist of plain coloured flags with the state arms charged at the centre or flags with a canton of a different colour containing the state arms. In addition, similarly designed Standards are also flown by high-ranking governments officials affiliated with the Sultan of Kedah. Like the state flag, all Standards utillise any two of or all three colours: Red, green and yellow; the colours of the arms also vary between Standards.

The Standards include:

 The Standard of the Sultan: A yellow flag with the state arms charged at the centre. The wreath and shield of the arms are green, while the crescent is red.
 The Standard of the Sultanah: A yellow flag with a red canton containing the state arms. Similar to the original arms, the wreath and shield of the Standard's arms are yellow, while the crescent is green.
 The Standard of the Crown Prince: A red flag with a yellow canton containing an entirely green state arms.
 The Standard of the Bendahara (Prime Minister): A red flag with a green canton containing an entirely yellow state arms.
 The Standard of the President of the State Council and Sultan Advisor: A green flag with the state arms charged at the centre. The arms is entirely yellow.

Maritime flags 

As a formerly independent state, Kedah was known to fly ensigns on its ships. Among them were the state ensign and civil ensign, the former similar in design as a variant of the Kedahan Standards, while the latter adopted a different design.

The state ensign took the appearance of a Standard-like design that simply incorporates a canton containing the state arms. The flag is blue, but unlike Standards of the design, its canton is essentially design as per the state flag, coloured red and containing the state arms in its original colours.

The civil ensign is of a completely different design, but incorporates all three of the state's flag colours in the form of three diagonally cut sections: A large, red, diagonal per bend stripe divides the upper fly—coloured yellow—and the lower hoist—coloured green.

Coat of arms 

The Kedahan coat of arms consists of only three heraldic elements: An escutcheon, a crescent, and a wreath; the arms may be illustrated with only the aforementioned elements or included against a red ellipse. Details of the arm's heraldic elements are as follows:

Escutcheon
The escutcheon, which consists of a yellow Swiss shield, represents the sovereign's authority and symbolises the role of the ruler as the protector and guardian of his subjects and all the inhabitants of Kedah from unjust governance; the shield also signifies strength and authority.Occasionally, a defacement with Jawi scriptures that reads "نݢري قدح" (State of Kedah) rest on the horizontal meridian on the shield. There has been known variations of defacements on the shield. The Jawi script may be written in black, red, or yellow (against a white band), and bands may be included behind the scripture. A variant of the shield may also include no Jawi scripts at all.

Crescent
The green crescent, which is located underneath the shield and faces upwards towards the shield, signifies Islam as the state's official religion.

Wreath or garland
The wreath or garland is depicted as two stalks of rice tied together and enveloping the shield and crescent. It represents rice as the state's principal product.

Like the state flag, the Kedahan arms is featured on Standards and the state ensign. However, the colours used on the arms may vary but utilise red, green or yellow, with the wreath and shield given one colour while the crescent is given another or the same.

City, district and municipal coat of arms

References

Kedah
Kedah
Kedah
Kedah
Flags including Arabic script
Kedah
Kedah